Vidernikovskaya is a rural locality (a village) in Zaborskoye Rural Settlement, Tarnogsky District, Vologda Oblast, Russia. The population was 6 as of 2002.

Geography 
Vidernikovskaya is located 27 km southwest of Tarnogsky Gorodok (the district's administrative centre) by road. Ozhiginskaya is the nearest rural locality.

References 

Rural localities in Tarnogsky District